Nina Bonner (born 25 March 1972 in New South Wales) is a retired female field hockey goalkeeper from Australia. She made her debut for the Australian women's national team during the 1996 season (Indira Gandhi Cup). Nicknamed Boona she was a member of the Hockeyroos at the 2002 Commonwealth Games in Manchester, where the team ended up in third place in the overall-rankings.

References
 Profile Australia Hockey

1972 births
Living people
Australian female field hockey players
Female field hockey goalkeepers
Field hockey players at the 2002 Commonwealth Games
Commonwealth Games bronze medallists for Australia
People from New South Wales
Commonwealth Games medallists in field hockey
21st-century Australian women
Medallists at the 2002 Commonwealth Games